Wickus van Vuuren (born 8 March 1989) is a South African cricketer. A left-handed batsman and leg break bowler, he has played first-class cricket for Boland since the 2010/11 season.

References
Wickus van Vuuren profile at CricketArchive

1989 births
Living people
Cricketers from Bloemfontein
South African cricketers
Boland cricketers